Huda Tower is a skyscraper located in Addis Ababa, Ethiopia. The 24 story building was completed in 2004, and houses the Ethiopia headquarters of the Sheikh Mohammed Hussein Al Amoudi-owned company MIDROC. Construction commenced in 1998, and ceased in 2004.

See also
Skyscraper design and construction
List of tallest buildings in Africa

References

2004 establishments in Ethiopia
Buildings and structures in Addis Ababa
Hotel buildings completed in 2004
21st-century architecture in Ethiopia